Ewonne Elisabet Winblad (née Callert; 1 April 1937 – 9 June 2022) was a Swedish journalist, author, television reporter, and director.

Early life and education
Winblad was born as Ewonne Elisabet Callert on 1 April 1937 at Katarina Parish in Stockholm. She studied at Stockholm University and the Stockholm School of Journalism.

Career
Winblad worked as a reporter, foreign correspondent and editorial secretary at Aftonbladet, reporter and editor-in-chief of Radio Stockholm, host and head of Rapport at SVT and channel manager for Sveriges Radio P1. She was a newscaster in Sweden's first TV news broadcast about the assassination of Olof Palme on 1 March 1986 at 04:00. She has also been a board member of Dagens Nyheter and a member of the government's commission on the events in Hallandsåsen (Tunnel Commission), the Security Services Commission and the Protection Registration Delegation. 

Winblad continued to work as a freelance journalist and writer. In 2008, she was awarded the H. M. The King's Medal in the 8th size of the Order of Seraphim for meritorious contributions to Swedish society.

Personal life
Winblad was married to journalist Lennart Winblad (1938–2022) and they had two children together. On 9 June 2022, it was announced that Winblad died.

References

1937 births
2022 deaths
20th-century Swedish journalists
Swedish women journalists
Journalists from Stockholm
Writers from Stockholm